Anthony of Supraśl was a Ruthenian monk and martyr, now venerated in the Polish Orthodox Church.

Biography
Anthony was born on the territory of the Grand Duchy of Lithuania into an Orthodox family, although his social status and lay name remain unknown. According to tradition, in his youth he was known for his angry character, having eventually killed a man in a bar brawl. Wishing to atone for sin, he entered the Supraśl Orthodox Monastery some time before 1506, where he received the name Anthony.

Considering his penance insufficient, Anthony asked the abbot for permission to go to a Muslim country, where he might receive martyrdom, which was then refused. Anthony had only received permission to go to Mount Athos, where he made his vows of Great Schema and took the name Onuphrius. He then went to Thessalonica, into the Church of the Theotokos Acheiropoietos, which had been converted into a mosque, and began to pray demonstratively. He was arrested and thrown into prison, demanded by the kadi to convert to Islam, which he consistently refused while attacking the religion. Finally, he was sentenced to be burned at the stake. Going to the place of execution, Anthony continued to denounce Islam, and even spat on the face of one of the guards. At this point, he was fatally hit by a club. His body was burned.

References

Charkiewicz, J. Święci ziemi białoruskiej. Bratczyk, Hajnówka 2006, 
Mironowicz, A. i M. Święty Antoni Supraski. Białystok 2014.

Polish saints of the Eastern Orthodox Church
1516 deaths
16th-century Eastern Orthodox martyrs
Christian saints killed by Muslims
Christians executed for refusing to convert to Islam
People associated with Mount Athos